, also known as simply Ju-on, is a 2000 Japanese V-Cinema supernatural horror film and the first installment in the Ju-on franchise, following two short films. The film was written and directed by Takashi Shimizu and is divided in six parts, chronicling the experiences of tenants of a cursed house where a man, Takeo Saeki (Takashi Matsuyama) killed his wife, Kayako (Takako Fuji), in a jealous rage. It was followed by Ju-on: The Curse 2 in the same year.

Plot
The film is told in non-chronological order through six segments, each titled after a character central to each segment. They are, in order: Toshio (俊雄), Yuki (由紀), Mizuho (瑞穂), Kanna (柑菜), Kayako (伽椰子), and Kyoko (響子).

Illustrator Takeo Saeki murdered his wife, Kayako, after discovering from her journal that she had held a deep crush with her college friend, Shunsuke Kobayashi. He also killed his son, Toshio Saeki, and the family cat, Mar, before deserting his house. The anger and sorrow surrounding the murder created a curse that turned its inhabitants into Onryō. Whoever enters the house in Nerima, Tokyo, or even those associating themselves with someone who has entered the house will be affected and claimed by the curse, spreading its influence at the place they die and claiming more victims.

Kobayashi, who happens to be Toshio's elementary school teacher, visits the Saeki house concerning Toshio's repeated absence from school, leaving his pregnant wife, Manami, in their apartment. He only finds Toshio, who refuses to speak with him, forcing him to wait for Toshio's parents to come home. Kobayashi grows weary of the strangeness that surrounds the house, and after accidentally stumbling upon Kayako's room, he learns of her unrequited love for him as well as her bloody corpse, hidden in the attic. Panicking, Kobayashi tries to escape with Toshio until he receives a call from Takeo, who has gone to his apartment and forcefully aborted Manami's unborn fetus, killing her. In shock, he is unable to respond properly as Kayako's animated corpse suddenly moves and kills him. Meanwhile, Takeo walks limply while carrying the dead fetus and is killed in the street by Kayako.

An unknown amount of time later, the Saeki house is occupied by the Murakami family. Daughter Kanna is taught by her tutor, Yuki, until she remembers that she has to go to school to feed the school rabbits. Yuki, who has a phobia of cats, backs up towards Kanna's closet when a black cat suddenly appears in the house. Hearing strange sounds from the attic, she goes to investigate and is pulled up by Kayako to her death. Kanna's brother, Tsuyoshi, however, is unaware of the incident and goes to school to meet his girlfriend, Mizuho Tamura. Tsuyoshi never makes it to the school and Mizuho is forced to wait in the teacher's room while a teacher inspects the school once more. There, she is spooked by Toshio until she receives a call from "4444444444" (the Japanese word for 4 (四, shi) is pronounced similarly to the word for "death" (死, shi), at which point Toshio appears directly beside her.

Meanwhile, Detective Yoshikawa and his aide, Kamio, investigate a mutilated body of a high school girl, Hisayo Yoshida, who is one of the two students scheduled to feed the school rabbits, and an unrelated human jaw nearby. Before leaving, Yoshikawa questions if a human can survive without a jaw. Back at the Murakami house, mother Noriko has just returned home from shopping when she notices a seemingly beaten up Kanna entering her house. She screams when her daughter moves to face her, showing her without her jaw.

Some time later, the Nerima house is taken over by the Suzuki Real Estate, owned by Tatsuya Suzuki, for sale. Tatsuya contacts his spiritually-aware sister, Kyoko, to visit the house. She immediately feels discomfort upon entering the house, and becomes further disturbed after a brief meeting with Kayako. After taking a gulp of sake, Kyoko tells Tatsuya that anyone who want to purchase the house has to drink the sake; if they spit it out, they should not buy it. She makes a hasty escape from the house, leaving her brother behind. A while later, Kyoko is informed that the house has been sold to the Kitada couple. She decides to check on the house once more and is shocked when she discovers that the wife, Yoshimi Kitada, has been possessed by Kayako.

Cast 
 Yūrei Yanagi as 
 Chiaki Kuriyama as 
 Hitomi Miwa as 
 Asumi Miwa as 
 Ryōta Koyama as Toshio Saeki
 Takako Fuji as Kayako Saeki
 Takashi Matsuyama as Takeo Saeki
 Kazushi Andō as 
 Yumi Yoshiyuki as 
 Yue as 
 Kaori Fujii as 
 Yūko Daike as 
 Makoto Ashikawa as

Release and reception

Ju-On: The Curse was released on home video on February 11, 2000.

AllMovie called it a "surprisingly effective low-budget horror video from Japan", writing, "while the plot never quite comes together—it's haphazard and confusing—the movie succeeds because of its unnervingly creepy atmosphere and consistently mournful and unsettling tone".

References

Sources

External links 
 
 Ju-on at the Japanese Movie Database
 

Films directed by Takashi Shimizu
Japanese nonlinear narrative films
Direct-to-video horror films
Japanese ghost films
2000 horror films
Toei Company films
2000 films
Films about curses
The Curse
2000s Japanese films